Iłówiec Wielki is a village in the administrative district of Gmina Brodnica, within Śrem County, Greater Poland Voivodeship, in west-central Poland. From 1975 to 1998, Iłówiec Wielki administratively belonged to Poznań Voivodeship.

The village has a population of 80.

References

Villages in Śrem County